Ratnaboli Ray is an Ashoka Fellow, trained clinical psychologist and mental health activist who is the founder of Anjali, a rights based organisation based in Kolkata, West Bengal, which works for persons with mental health condition and or psychosocial disability. She was awarded  the  Human Rights Watch's Alison Des Forges Award for Extraordinary Activism.
She has been recognised as powerful impact woman by Business Today. She was awarded Times Woman Hero by Times Of India.

References

Indian human rights activists
Ashoka India Fellows